The Grachonok class, Russian designation Project 21980 Grachonok, is a class of anti-saboteur and large guard boats being built for the Russian Navy. The class is designed to combat sabotage and terrorist forces and means in the waters off bases and near the approaches to them, as well as to assist the Border Service of the Federal Security Service of the Russian Federation in solving the problems of preservation and protection of the state border of Russia. Twenty-seven boats were built since 2008.

History
In October 2017, four additional ships were ordered by the National Guard of Russia. These ships are intended for protection of the Crimean Bridge.

Ships

References

External links

 

Patrol vessels of the Russian Navy
Patrol boat classes